Sissiosasto/5.D (5th Division Sissi Detachment, SissiOs./5.D, Unit Identification Code 2272) was a Finnish Army special sissiunit during the Continuation War. The Detachment was founded on August 20, 1941, under the Lynx Division (5th Division, Finnish VI Corps). It was a self-contained unit for reconnaissance patrolling, sabotage and guerrilla warfare operations behind enemy lines.

SissiOs./5.D was rounded up by Second Lieutenant V.I. Laajoki from the 51 volunteers he recruited from the 5th Division sub-units (e.g. JR 22). In the autumn of 1941 SissiOs./5.D did short reconnaissance patrols in the recently captured areas by the Svir River. From the beginning of 1942, the detachment took part on longer reconnaissance patrols, independently and together with other Sissiunits.

Šemenski-Pertjärvi
In April 1942 Osasto Uimonen (ad hoc squad, size of a company) was formed from SissiOs./5.D, SissiOs./17.D and Osasto Vehniäinen, the squad was named after the commander of SissiOs./5.D Lieutenant E.A. Uimonen. They had an order to destroy a Soviet logistic centre, similar mission as Osasto Honkanen's highly successful destruction patrol to Petrovo-Jam's logistics centre couple of months earlier. April 11 the squad was divided in two groups, as the plan was to surprise the Soviet troops in the front from both flanks. The group led by Lieutenant Uimonen faced the enemy soon and destroyed targeted squad, but they soon realised that they have been flanked by outnumbered enemy. The squad lost 7 men in the following battle, including Second Lieutenant V.J. Arponen and squadleader Uimonen, who stayed behind his withdrawing men with two volunteers to hold the enemy. The intel they had suggested the enemy strength on the area to be a platoon, but in reality Soviets had a whole battalion there. The Soviet troops Osasto Uimonen faced on the field were in fact preparing for a surprise attack, which they launched on the same day. After the mission failed and SissiOs./5.D lost all its acting officers, it was subordinated to Kevyt osasto 19 (KevOs 19) and took part in frontline battle in the Šemenski-Pertjärvi area until the end of April and Finnish defensive victory.

SissiOs./5.D's K.I.A.
5th Division Sissi Detachment K.I.A.'s listed by the date of their death

See also
 Finnish conquest of East Karelia (1941)

Sources

References

Military units and formations of Finland in World War II
Military units and formations established in 1941
Continuation War